Foscolo was a Venetian aristocratic house. A branch of the family settled in Greece following the Fourth Crusade, their name later hellenized as Foskolos. Notable members include:

Notable members 
 Leonardo Foscolo, Lord of Anafi, 13th-century Venetian ruler of Anafi
 Leonardo Foscolo, 17th-century Venetian commander
 Nikolaos Foskolos (born 1937), Roman Catholic Archbishop of Athens
 Nikos Foskolos (1927–2013), Greek screenwriter and director
 Paolo Augusto Foscolo, Latin Patriarch of Jerusalem
 Ugo Foscolo (1778–1827), Italian writer, poet and revolutionary

Noble families
Italian-language surnames